Vijay Adhiraj is an Indian actor who has appeared in Tamil, Telugu, Hindi, and Kannada films and serials. He was introduced in the NFDC & Doordarshan produced Sahashraphan in Hindi, written by then Prime Minister of India Shri. P. V. Narasimha Rao and directed by the Kannada T. S. Nagabharana.

Career 
Adhiraj made his acting debut starring in television serials, before featuring in films including Ponnu Veetukkaran and Roja Kootam. Throughout the 2000s, he became an established television and live event host.

Suzhal, directed by his father the late Shri Anand Mohan and written by him, launched him into the limelight. It was followed by Nimmadhi Ungal Choice, produced by AVM Productions and directed by Shri Sp. Muthuraman. Ganesh–Vasanth, written by Sujatha, produced by Madras Talkies and directed by Suhasini Manirathnam, helped establish his credentials as an actor.

Chithi, produced by Radaan Mediaworks, established him as a sought after television star, and gave him the title "Superstar" of the small screen.

He finished as runner up in the reality dance show Jodi Number One during season 1, alongside his wife, Rachana.

He has since directed a film, Puthagam, which starred Sathya, Jagapati Babu and Rakul Preet Singh. Adhiraj wrote the script in 1998, but was advised by his peers, including Crazy Mohan, to wait before launching the production. The film had a low key release in January 2013 and received average reviews from critics.

He has hosted many famous functions, including the Littleshows Award.

Filmography

Film

Television series

Web series

As director

Voice Artist

References 

Indian male film actors
Living people
Male actors in Tamil cinema
Tamil film directors
Tamil male television actors
Tamil television presenters
Tamil Reality dancing competition contestants
Male actors in Kannada cinema
20th-century Indian male actors
21st-century Indian male actors
Year of birth missing (living people)